Alta is an unincorporated community in Greenbrier County, West Virginia, United States. Alta is located at the junction of Interstate 64, U.S. Route 60 and West Virginia Route 12, northwest of Lewisburg.

References

Unincorporated communities in Greenbrier County, West Virginia
Unincorporated communities in West Virginia